Josephine's lorikeet (Charmosyna josefinae) is a species of parrot in the family Psittaculidae.
It is found in the highlands of New Guinea (central range and Cyclops Mountains).
Its natural habitats are subtropical or tropical moist lowland forest and subtropical or tropical moist montane forest.

Description 
Josephine's lorikeet is red with green wings, a yellow-tipped tail, dusky blue, orange bill, yellow eye and black flanks.

Diet 
It feeds on nectar, pollen, flower buds and sometimes soft fruits.

References

Josephine's lorikeet
Josephine's lorikeet
Taxonomy articles created by Polbot